Verònica Canals i Riba (born 29 October 1970) is an Andorran business manager and politician who served as Minister of Tourism since 21 May 2019 under the Premiership of Xavier Espot.

Born in Encamp, Canals got a degree in Economy for the University of Strasbourg and a master's degree in Business Management for the HEC Montréal. She worked in Adecco in Spain and returned to Andorra to work in Grandvalira-Saetde (the company that manages some of the Andorran ski stations) in 1999, being its director of catering and complementary services until 2009, and since then, its national director until she left the office in Summer 2018.

On 21 May 2019, newly elected Prime Minister Xavier Espot named her Minister of Tourism. On 5 May 2021 she announced she was resigning the office "for strictly personal and family reasons", and will be succeeded by Jordi Torres on July.

References

1970 births
Living people
Andorran businesspeople
Andorran women in politics
Tourism Ministers of Andorra
Government ministers of Andorra
Women government ministers of Andorra
University of Strasbourg alumni
HEC Montréal alumni
People from Encamp
21st-century women politicians
Democrats for Andorra politicians